Carpatolechia minor is a moth of the family Gelechiidae. It is found in Austria.

The wingspan is 12.9-14.3 mm. The forewings are brownish-grey with ill-defined black flecks and stripes and a prominent spot. The hindwings are brownish-grey, but lighter at the base.

The larvae feed on Ulmus minor. They are light brown.

References

Moths described in 1978
Carpatolechia
Moths of Europe